Zequs.com (previously known as PleaseFund.Us) is an online crowd funding platform that operates in an 'All or Nothing' method for individuals or groups to raise funds for creative projects. The site utilises social networks, with the use of social media, to help promote current projects. There are no restrictions from where those looking for funding are based. The head office is located in Queens Club, London.

Model
When creating a project, project owners must choose their funding target and a timeline in which to raise it in.

Project owners must incentivise donors with the use of non-monetary rewards that are generally related to their project, and ultimately sell these rewards through their own social networks.  This is not an investment. The project owner retains full ownership and control of the idea. However, projects launched on the site are permanently archived and accessible to the public; they cannot be removed or edited after a project has expired. 

Similar to the US platform, Kickstarter, the site runs an “all or nothing” policy: Also known as a provision point mechanism, this means that if a target isn’t met then all of the people who supported that project are refunded and the project owners gets nothing. 
For all successful projects, Zequs charge a fixed rate of 5% of the funds raised, whilst PayPal charge an additional 3-5%. No fee is charged for unsuccessful projects, but PayPal holds all the money pledged to a project until its deadline is reached.

History

PleaseFund.Us was founded in 2011, and launched in September 2011 with £40,000 by James Bailey. As a result of the 2009 financial crisis and subsequent cuts to subsidies that hit the UK arts scene, the company was set up in order to help other people secure arts funding in a community-led way.

The PleaseFund.Us website has had some successes since its launch, but has currently not achieved anywhere near the popularity of the US site Kickstarter.

Notable Projects

RealTennis.Tv is a company that broadcasts Live [Real Tennis] over the internet.

A British documentary exploring the existence of Great White Sharks off the coast of Britain, by Rufus Elliott and titled When Jaws Came to Visit was partially funded by PleaseFund.Us. Notable people, including Nigella Lawson donated in support of the campaign.

See also 
 Comparison of crowd funding services

References

External links 
 Zequs Website
Zequs Partner Website

Defunct crowdfunding platforms
Crowdfunding platforms of Canada